Endothamna marmarocyma is a moth in the Copromorphidae family, and the only species in the genus Endothamna. It is found in Chile.

References

Natural History Museum Lepidoptera generic names catalog

Copromorphidae
Endemic fauna of Chile